Jean-Paul Dubois (born 1950 in Toulouse, Haute-Garonne) is a French journalist and author. He won the Prix Goncourt in 2019 for Tous les hommes n'habitent pas le monde de la même façon ("All Men Do Not Inhabit This World in the Same Way"), a novel told from the perspective of a prisoner looking back on life. The jury compared Dubois to John Irving and William Boyd, who wrote books that were both popular and critical successes. 

He is the author of several novels and travel pieces, and is a reporter for Le Nouvel Observateur. His novel, Une vie française, published in French in 2004 and in English in 2007, is a saga of the French baby boom generation, from the idealism of the 1960s to the consumerism of the 1990s. The French version of the novel won the Prix Femina.

Works
 Tous les matins je me lève : roman, Éditions Robert Laffont, 1988, 
 Kennedy et moi: roman, Seuil, 1996, 
 Je pense à autre chose, Editions de l'Olivier, 1997, 
 Si ce livre pouvait me rapprocher de toi, Éditions de l'Olivier, 1999, 
 ; Random House Digital, Inc. 2008, 
 A French Life, Penguin Books, 2008, 
 Foreword to 
Le cas Sneijder,  Editions de l'Olivier, 2011, 
Tous les hommes n'habitent pas le monde de la même façon,  Editions de l'Olivier, 2019, Prix Goncourt

References

External links 
 

1950 births
Living people
Writers from Toulouse
20th-century French novelists
21st-century French novelists
French travel writers
French journalists
Prix Femina winners
Prix Goncourt winners
French male novelists
20th-century French male writers
21st-century French male writers
French male non-fiction writers